Roger Cardinal (1940 - 2017) was a Canadian film director from Quebec. He was most noted for the 1988 film Malarek, for which he was a Genie Award nominee for Best Director at the 10th Genie Awards in 1989.

His other credits included the films The Storm, Sex in the Snow (Après-ski), L'Apparition, Captive, Dead Silent, Risque and Brilliant, and episodes of the television series Urban Angel, Au nom du père et du fils and René Lévesque.

References

External links

1940 births
2017 deaths
20th-century Canadian screenwriters
20th-century Canadian male writers
Film directors from Quebec
Canadian screenwriters in French
Canadian male screenwriters
Writers from Quebec